Martinus Spyridon Johannes Lodewijk (born 30 April 1939) is a Dutch comics writer and cartoonist, and advertising adviser.

Martin Lodewijk was born in Rotterdam. He dropped out of high school in 1957, and started drawing cartoons, notably of spacecraft and pirates. In 1959, his first cartoon was published in the newspaper Het Parool, after which he specialized in drawing for commercial advertising. For the weekly comics magazine Pep, he co-created with Jan Kruis the Agent 327 comic in 1966, a feature he ended up writing and drawing for close to fifty years. He provided scripts for other strips, such as Don Lawrence's Storm. After Pep and Sjors merged into Eppo, Lodewijk became Eppo's chief editor.

In 1999, Lodewijk published the world's smallest comic book; Minimum Bug (26 mm by 37 mm). It belongs to the Agent 327 series.

From 2004 onward, Lodewijk succeeded Willy Vandersteen and Karel Biddeloo as writer for De Rode Ridder, with drawings by Claus Scholz.

Lodewijk worked on the third open source movie by the Blender Foundation, Sintel, released in 2010.

Personal life
In 1973, Martin Lodewijk and his brother Tim participated in the knowledge quiz show Twee voor Twaalf. The brothers won, and returned for the special jubilee quiz in 2005, where they reached the finals.

Awards 
For his whole work in comics, Lodewijk was presented the Stripschapprijs in 1978, the highest award in the Dutch comics world.

On 29 April 2011 Martin Lodewijk was invested as a Knight of the Order of Orange-Nassau. He received this royal medal because of his comic work.

Comics
 Agent 327 — all volumes (artist and writer)
 Storm — (writer)
 January Jones
 Johnny Goodbye
 Bernard Voorzichtig
 De Rode Ridder (writer)
 Lucky Luke, Volume: La Corde du pendu 1982 (Eng: "The Rope of the Hanged") (writer)

References

External links
 Martin Lodewijk at Comiclopedia

Dutch cartoonists
Dutch comics artists
Dutch comics writers
Dutch humorists
Dutch satirists
1939 births
Living people
Artists from Rotterdam
Winners of the Stripschapsprijs